Woodcock is a relatively uncommon English surname that seems to have originated from varied roots in the Early Middle Ages.

Notable Woodcocks 
Ashley Woodcock (born 1947), Australian cricketer
Bill Woodcock (born 1971), American computer scientist
Bruce Woodcock (boxer) (1921–1997), English boxer
Bruce Woodcock (computer games analyst) (born 1970), computer games analyst
Carla Woodcock (born 1998), English actress
Charles Woodcock (1850–1923), lover of King Karl of Württemberg
Cheryl Woodcock, American producer and TV personality
George Woodcock (1912–1995), Canadian writer and historian
George Woodcock (cricketer) (1894–1968), batsman
George Woodcock (trade unionist) (1904–1979), English trade unionist
Janet Woodcock (born 1948), American physician, acting Commissioner of the FDA
Jim Woodcock, British computer scientist
John A. Woodcock Jr. (born 1950), United States federal judge
John Woodcock (American football) (1954–1998), American football player
John Woodcock (cricket writer) (1926–2021), British cricket writer and journalist
John Woodcock (magistrate) (born 1967), Italian prosecutor
John Woodcock (martyr) (1603–1646), English Franciscan martyr
John Woodcock (politician) (born 1978), British politician
Jonathan Woodcock (born 1962), Royal Navy officer
Leonard F. Woodcock (1911–2001), trade union leader, American diplomat
Leslie V. Woodcock (born 1945), professor of chemical thermodynamics at the University of Manchester
Luke Woodcock (born 1982), New Zealand cricketer
Peter Woodcock (1939–2010), Canadian serial killer, rapist, and necrophile
Richard Woodcock (born 1928), a developer of the Woodcock–Johnson Tests of Cognitive Abilities
Steven Woodcock (born 1964), British actor
Thomas Woodcock (officer of arms) (born 1951), British Officer of Arms
Thomas Woodcock (VC) (1888–1918), a British recipient of the Victoria Cross
Tommy Woodcock (1905–1985), Australian strapper of champion horse Phar Lap
Tony Woodcock (footballer) (born 1955), English (soccer) football player
Tony Woodcock (rugby player) (born 1981), New Zealand rugby player
William John Woodcock (c. 1808 – 1868), Anglican priest in South Australia

English-language surnames
English toponymic surnames